The 2006 Abilene Christian Wildcats football team was an American football team that represented Abilene Christian University (ACU) as a member of the Lone Star Conference (LSC) during the 2007 NCAA Division II football season. In their third season under head coach Chris Thomsen, the Wildcats compiled an 10–3 record (8–1 against conference opponents). They were selected to the Division II playoffs, where they defeated Mesa State before they were defeated by Chadron State in triple overtime, 76–73.

All 10 wins, including the 8 conference wins were later vacated due to NCAA violations.

The team played its home games at Shotwell Stadium in Abilene, Texas.

Schedule

References

Abilene Christian
Abilene Christian Wildcats football seasons
Abilene Christian Wildcats football